Elles Voskes (born 3 August 1964 in Amsterdam, North Holland) is a former freestyle swimmer from The Netherlands, who competed for her native country at the 1984 Summer Olympics in Los Angeles, United States.

There she won the silver medal in the 4×100 m freestyle relay, alongside Conny van Bentum, Desi Reijers, and Annemarie Verstappen, just like a year earlier at the European LC Championships in Rome, Italy.

References
 Dutch Olympic Committee

1964 births
Living people
Olympic swimmers of the Netherlands
Dutch female freestyle swimmers
Swimmers at the 1984 Summer Olympics
Olympic silver medalists for the Netherlands
Swimmers from Amsterdam
European Aquatics Championships medalists in swimming
Medalists at the 1984 Summer Olympics
Olympic silver medalists in swimming
20th-century Dutch women